The Maid of the Mist is a sightseeing boat tour of Niagara Falls, starting and ending on the American side, crossing briefly into Canada during a portion of the trip.

The fleet currently consists of two vessels, both of which launched in 2020. The James V. Glynn was named in honor of the Maid of the Mist Chairman and CEO, who in 2020 celebrated 70 years with the company, and the Nikola Tesla, for the man who invented the alternating current (AC) motor, the standard form of electricity that is used in American homes to this day. Tesla’s invention prompted George Westinghouse to invite him to join his team that won the bid to build the power plant at Niagara Falls.  Prior to the current two boats, all prior ships had been named Maid of the Mist, dating back to 1846.  The first ships were steam powered; these were replaced by diesel-powered vessels from 1955 until 2019, and later replaced with the current two boats powered by lithium-ion battery-powered electric motors.

The name, Maid of the Mist, could be a reference to the Iroquois myth of Lelawala.

History

The United States 
The original Maid of the Mist was built at a landing near Niagara Falls on the American side of the border.  The boat was christened in 1846 as a border-crossing ferry; its first trip was on September 18, 1846.  The two-stage barge-like steamer was designed primarily as a link for a proposed ferry service between New York City and Toronto. It was a 72-foot-long side-wheeler with an 18-foot beam which was powered by steam produced from a wood- and coal-fired boiler. It could carry up to 100 passengers.

The ferry did well until 1848, when the opening of a suspension bridge between the United States and Canada cut into the ferry traffic.  It was then that the owners decided to make the journey a sightseeing trip, plotting a journey closer to the Falls.

The present day Maid of the Mist Corporation was formed in 1884 by Captain R. F. Carter and Frank LaBlond, who invested in a new Maid that would launch in 1885. Captain Carter and Mr. LaBlond hired Alfred H. White from Port Robinson, Ontario to build the new ship. A letter in the archives of the Buffalo Historical Society from Mr. LaBlond to Alfred White says that they are well pleased with the vessel and asks Alfred to add a wale onto the boat.

The service is run by Maid of the Mist Corp. of Niagara Falls, New York.  Maid of the Mist has been owned by the Glynn family since 1971.

James V. Glynn is chairman and chief executive officer of Maid of the Mist Corp. Glynn joined Maid of the Mist in 1950 as a ticket seller, and purchased the company in 1971. During his tenure, Maid of the Mist expanded operations, achieving ten-fold growth.

Canada 
Access to the river-level attraction on the Canadian side was provided by the Maid of the Mist Incline Railway, a funicular railway, between 1894 and 1990, to travel between street level and the boat dock. As this service proved increasingly inadequate in transporting the growing passenger base of the 1990s, four high-speed elevators replaced the railway in 1991. On the American side, the dock is reached by four elevators enclosed in the observation tower. 

The Russel Brothers of Owen Sound, Ont. made two all steel Maids for the Niagara Falls gorge, in 1955 and 1956. The first one is now based in Parry Sound, Ont. and runs dinner cruises and day excursions. The second Maid was sold in 1983 to the United Pentecostal Church of Ontario and destined for missionary service in the Amazon. Maid of the Mist II took part in the 9 July 1960, rescue of Roger Woodward, a seven-year-old boy who became the first person to survive a plunge over the Horseshoe Falls with nothing but a life jacket. Maid of the Mist II served as a Maid of the Mist until 1983. Subsequently she was relocated to the Amazon River, where she served as a missionary ship for some years.

A partial history of Maid of the Mist is featured in the IMAX film Niagara: Miracles, Myths and Magic.

Notable passengers
While on his 1860 tour of Canada, Albert Edward, Prince of Wales (later King Edward VII), rode on Maid of the Mist.

In June 1952, Marilyn Monroe rode the Maid of the Mist while in Niagara Falls to film the movie, Niagara.

Mikhail Gorbachev was a passenger in 1983.

In 1991, Prince Charles and Princess Diana, and their two young sons, Princes William and Harry, rode on Maid of the Mist.

In 2003, BBC Scotland's popular comedy sit-com Still Game made mention of the Maid of the Mist when lead characters Jack and Victor visited the formers family in Canada, and Victor takes Jack's grandson's aboard off screen.

In 2009, NBC-TV's popular sit-com The Office filmed scenes on Maid of the Mist. The episode centered on the wedding of the characters Jim and Pam.

Boats

Original ships

The first series boats to bear the "Maid of the Mist" moniker were steam-powered wooden-hulled ferries.  These were in use until an early-season fire destroyed the last of them in 1955.

First Maid of the Mist 
 Years of service: 1846–1854
 Type: double-stack steamboat ferry
 Engine: one sidewheel steam

Second Maid of the Mist
 Years of service: 1854–1860
 Length: 
 Type: single-stack steamer
 Engine: paddle boat

Third Maid of the Mist
 Years of service: 1885–1955
 Type: steam boat
Fourth Maid of the Mist
 Years of service: 1892–1955
 Type: white oak steamboat
 Length: 
 Engine: two-engine steam

Diesel vessels

After a fire destroyed the last of the wooden-hulled steamers, they were replaced by steel-hulled, diesel powered ferries, launched in 1955 and 1956.  About every 20 years or so, new ships were added to the fleet, of increasingly larger capacity; the initial Maid of the Mist held only 101 passengers, while the last of the diesel-powered vessels, Maid of the Mist VII, could hold up to 600.  The last of these were retired in 2019, to be replaced by an electric-powered fleet.

Maid of the Mist I
 Years of service: 1955–1990
 Length: 
 Engine:  diesel engines
 Passengers: 101

Maid of the Mist II
 Years of service: 1956–1983
 Type: all-steel boat, twin of I
 Engine:  diesel engines
 Passengers: 101

Maid of the Mist III 
 Years of service: 1972–1997
 Length: 
 Gross tonnage: 75
 Engine: single  diesel
 Passengers: 210

Maid of the Mist IV
 Years of service: 1976–2013
 Length: 
 Gross tonnage: 75
 Engine: two  diesel
 Passengers: 300

Maid of the Mist V
 Years of service: 1983–2013
 Length: 
 Gross tonnage:  74
 Engine: two  diesel
 Passengers: 300

Maid of the Mist VI
 Years of service: 1990–2019
 Length: 
 Breadth:  
 Depth:  
 Gross tonnage:  155
 Engine: two  diesel
 Passengers: 600

Maid of the Mist VII
 Years of service: 1997–2020 
 Length: 
 Breadth: 
 Depth: 
 Gross tonnage:  155
 Engine: two  diesel
 Passengers: 600

Electric vessels

Beginning with the 2020 season, the Maid of the Mist launched two all-new electric ships, with a similar size and capacity to the prior diesel-powered ones.

James V. Glynn
 Years of service: 2020–present
 Length: 
 Breadth: 
 Depth: 
 Propulsion System: Lithium-ion battery packs power the all-electric motor
 Passengers: 600

Nikola Tesla
 Years of service: 2020–present 
 Length: 
 Breadth: 
 Depth: 
 Propulsion System: Lithium-ion battery packs power the all-electric motor
 Passengers: 600

Little Maid
 A small tug-like vessel found at the docks on the American side

References

External links

 Russel Brothers Boat Archive
 Maid of the Mist
 Images from the Historic Niagara Digital Collections
 Maid of the Mist Walking Tour
 Diana Princess of Wales, Prince William and Prince Harry aboard the Maid of the Mist Niagara Falls Public Library (Ont.)

1846 establishments in New York (state)
Culture of Niagara Falls, Ontario
Niagara Falls
Transportation in Niagara Falls, New York
Transport in Niagara Falls, Ontario
Tourist attractions in Niagara County, New York
Tourist attractions in Niagara Falls, Ontario
Niagara Falls State Park